Orania maestratii is a species of sea snail, a marine gastropod mollusk in the family Muricidae, the murex snails or rock snails.

Description
The length of the shell attains 10.1 mm.

Distribution
This marine species occurs off the Austral Islands, French Polynesia.

References

External links
 Houart, R. & Tröndlé, J. (2008). Update of Muricidae (excluding Coralliophilinae) from French Polynesia with description of ten new species. Novapex. 9 (2-3): 53-93

Gastropods described in 2008
Orania (gastropod)